Giuseppe Sacchi (17th Century) was an Italian painter of the Baroque period.

The son of the famous Andrea Sacchi, Giuseppe painted both historical canvases and portraits. He became a friar minor and died young.

References

17th-century Italian painters
Italian male painters
Italian Baroque painters
Year of death unknown
Year of birth unknown